Downtown Science was a short-lived American hip hop duo composed of rapper/producer Kenneth "Bosco Money" Carabello and producer Sam "Sever" Citrin; they were signed to Def Jam Recordings. The group has released four singles from 1988 to 1991, and one and only self-titled studio album in 1991. Their song "If I Was" appeared in Livin' Large! Original Motion Picture Soundtrack.

Discography
Albums
1991: Downtown Science
Singles
 1988: "Now Listen"
 1991: "Big Yellow 12-Inch"
 1991: "Radioactive"
 1991: "Room to Breathe"

American musical duos
Def Jam Recordings artists
Hip hop duos
Hip hop groups from New York City
Musical groups established in 1988
Musical groups disestablished in 1992
Musical groups from Queens, New York
1991 establishments in New York City